James Purcell (25 November 1874 – 5 November 1953) was an Australian businessman of the early 20th century, mainly active in the dairy industry on the Darling Downs in Queensland.

Early life 
Born in the town of Drayton, Purcell assisted his father, a farm-hand, in raising and farming dairy cattle.  In 1897, he purchased land of his own near Westbrook and began dairy farming.

Public roles 
Purcell was a founding member of The Downs Co-operative Dairy Company Ltd, the Queensland Butter Board, and was a member of the Queensland Dairy Products Stabilisation Board, serving as its chairman from 1930 to 1950, and also served as Vice-President of the Queensland Council of Agriculture.  He also served as Chairman of the Clifton Shire Council from 1911 to 1912.

Later life 
Purcell died at his home in Toowoomba on 5 November 1953 following a long illness.

References

Australian food industry businesspeople
People from the Darling Downs
1874 births
1953 deaths